Pepsi-Cola Made with Real Sugar, originally called Pepsi Throwback—and still branded that way in some markets—is a soft drink sold by PepsiCo. The drink is flavored with cane sugar and beet sugar instead of high fructose corn syrup, with which soft drink companies replaced sugar in their North American products in the 1980s. In June 2014, the Pepsi Throwback name was replaced by the current name, which continues to be made without high fructose corn syrup. As of April 2020 it received a new logo. The "throwback" name was also used for a variant of PepsiCo's citrus-flavored Mountain Dew.

Development  
The cost of sugar in the US started to rise in the late 1970s and into the 1980s due to government-imposed tariffs, prompting soft drink manufacturers to switch to high fructose corn syrup (HFCS) as a cheaper alternative to sugar. By the mid-1980s, all of the major soft drink brands switched to HFCS for their North American products, with the original formula of Coca-Cola being one of the last holdouts. In most countries, sugar is still used rather than HFCS.

In early 2009, PepsiCo announced plans to release versions of Pepsi (and Mountain Dew) with pure cane sugar as its main sweetener, and without the citric acid found in regular Pepsi, on a limited basis. The original shipment went on sale in April 2009, and ended in June. Sales were strong for both, prompting PepsiCo to release a second limited edition for December 2009–February 2010.

A third batch was released on July 31, 2010, again as a five-week limited availability.

On October 12, Consumerist.com reported that Pepsi had decided to continue offering the Throwback line as long as consumers continue to buy it.

A fourth batch appeared in stores in late December 2010, without a limited edition logo on the packaging.

In January 2011, Pepsi Throwback began appearing in 12-packs of  355-ml cans, 591-ml bottles, and 32-pack 355-ml cans across Canada. In March 2011, Pepsi Throwback was discontinued in Canada but returned in October 2012.

On 11 March 2011, PepsiCo announced that both Pepsi Throwback and Mountain Dew Throwback would become permanent additions to the Pepsi and Mountain Dew product lines.

In 2014, Pepsi Throwback was replaced in most regions by "Pepsi-Cola Made with Real Sugar". This product has 10 mg less sodium than the previous Pepsi Throwback, and 1 g less sugar per 20 fl oz (591 mL), reducing the labelled calorie count on a bottle of that size from 260 to 250.

Packaging 

The first release featured the 1940s Pepsi-Cola script in royal blue on a navy blue background with the word "throwback" written in the modern font. With the second release in December 2009, Pepsi used an exact replica of the 1973–1987 logo.

The change in branding away from the "Throwback" name has led to new packaging. The Pepsi-Cola Made with Real Sugar label is a variant of the current Pepsi label that retains the current blue background and Pepsi globe version, but replaces the lowercase "pepsi" text with the 1940s era "Pepsi-Cola" script logo accompanied by a banner reading "Made with Real Sugar".

Nutritional comparison

Similar competing drinks 
Dr Pepper started selling "Heritage Dr Pepper" in response in November 2009. Sugar-sweetened Dr Pepper was available from a single bottling plant in Texas until 12 January 2012 (see Dublin Dr Pepper).

In a rare move of no competition within the Cola Wars, Coca-Cola had no plans, as of early December 2012, to release a sugar-sweetened version of Coca-Cola on a regular basis. Aside from Kosher Coca-Cola, sold only for the Jewish holiday of Passover, and Mexican Coke, sold via import in the United States, the last time Coca-Cola was sold with sugar rather than high-fructose corn syrup was in 1985, just before the introduction of New Coke. The only exceptions began in 2007, when Coca-Cola bottlers in Cleveland, Ohio and Allentown, Pennsylvania started using sugar as a sweetener year-round for Coca-Cola, making these two markets the only ones in which sugar-sweetened Coca-Cola was sold throughout the year.

In 2011, Dr Pepper Snapple Group announced 7UP Retro, a sugar-sweetened version of 7UP, that would be available for a limited time. This became a direct competitor to Mountain Dew Throwback, but 7UP Retro stopped production later in the year, while Mountain Dew Throwback continued production. Mexican 7UP, which is exported to the United States, still has sugar.

See also 
 Pepsi Raw – another variant with real sugar marketed in the UK during 2008–2010 (and a similar concept variant called Pepsi Natural in the U.S).
 Jones Soda – switched to cane sugar in 2007

References

External links
 

Nostalgia
PepsiCo soft drinks
Sugar
Products introduced in 2009
Mountain Dew
Caffeinated soft drinks